Baruth is a village in the east of Saxony, Germany. It is part of the municipality of Malschwitz. It belongs to the district of Bautzen and lies 15 km northeast of the eponymous city. The Sorbs have long inhabited the area; while their numbers are declining, the Upper Sorbian language is still the second official language.

History
From 1952 to 1990, Baruth was part of the Bezirk Dresden of East Germany.

References

External links 
Official homepage

Populated places in Bautzen (district)